Jakubiak is a Polish surname. Notable people with the surname include:

 Alex Jakubiak (born 1996), Scottish footballer
 Bella Jakubiak (born 1983), self-taught Australian chef
 Elżbieta Jakubiak (born 1966), Polish politician
 Marek Jakubiak, Polish politician
 Paweł Jakubiak (born 1974), Polish field hockey player
 Sebastian Jakubiak (born 1993), German footballer

Polish-language surnames